Lifeboat is a 1944 American survival film directed by Alfred Hitchcock from a story by John Steinbeck. It stars Tallulah Bankhead and William Bendix, alongside Walter Slezak, Mary Anderson, John Hodiak, Henry Hull, Heather Angel, Hume Cronyn and Canada Lee. The film is set entirely on a lifeboat launched from a passenger vessel torpedoed and sunk by a Nazi U-boat.

The first in Hitchcock's "limited-setting" films, the others being Rope (1948), Dial M for Murder and Rear Window (both 1954), it is the only film Hitchcock made for 20th Century Fox. The film received three Oscar nominations for Best Director, Best Original Story and Best CinematographyBlack and White. Bankhead won the New York Film Critics Circle Award for Best Actress.

Though highly controversial in its time for what many interpreted as its sympathetic depiction of a German U-boat captain, Lifeboat is now viewed more favorably and has been listed by several modern critics as one of Hitchcock's more underrated films.

Plot
Eight British and American civilians, service members and United States Merchant Mariners are stuck in a lifeboat after their ship and a German U-boat sink each other in combat. Willi, a German survivor, is pulled aboard. During an animated debate, engine room crewman Kovac demands the German be thrown out to drown. However, the others object, with radioman Stanley, wealthy industrialist Rittenhouse and columnist Connie Porter succeeding in arguing that he be allowed to stay. Porter is thrilled at having photographed the battle, but her photo camera is the first of her many possessions to be lost overboard in a succession of incidents.

Mrs. Higley, a young British woman whose infant child is dead when they are pulled from the water, must be tied down to stop her from hurting herself. She jumps off the boat in Porter's mink coat, while the other passengers sleep. Willi is revealed to be the U-boat captain, rather than a mere crewman.

The inhabitants attempt to organize their rations, set a course for Bermuda, and coexist as they try to survive. The passengers also cooperate through this stress, such as when they must amputate the leg of one of their boatmates, the injured Gus Smith.

Kovac takes charge, rationing the little food and water they have, but Willi, who has been consulting a concealed compass and reveals that he speaks English, wrests control away from him in a storm.

Gus Smith, who has been drinking seawater and is hallucinating, catches Willi drinking water from a hidden flask. Gus tries to tell Stanley but Stanley doesn't believe him. While the others sleep, Willi pushes him over the side. Gus' calls for help rouse Stanley and the others, but it is too late.

When the inhabitants realize that Willi does actually have a flask of water, Joe pulls it from Willi's shirt, but it breaks. Willi explains that like everyone on a U-boat he had food tablets and energy pills. To survive, one must have a plan.

In anger, they descend upon Willi as a group, all but Joe, to beat Willi and toss him from the boat to his death.

Later, Rittenhouse says that he will never understand Willi's ingratitude. "What do you do with people like that?" No one answers. Stanley proposes to Alice, and she accepts, although they have little hope of surviving.

Connie chastises everyone for giving up then offers her bracelet as bait for fish. A fish strikes, but Joe sights a ship, and in the rush for the oars, the line goes overboard and the bracelet is lost.

It is the German supply ship to which Willi had been steering them. But before a launch can pick them up, both it and the supply ship are sunk by gunfire from a US warship and a brief battle is waged between the two ships which nearly destroys the little boat. After the battle ends, Kovac estimates that the Allied vessel will be there in 20 minutes. Connie panics over her appearance. Joe hopes his wife isn't worried. Rittenhouse admires a picture of Joe's family and still persists in calling him "Pullman porter George". They talk briefly about their plans for after the rescue.

A frightened, wounded, young German seaman is pulled aboard the lifeboat. Rittenhouse is now all for killing him, and the others, including Kovac, have to hold him back. The German sailor pulls a gun but is disarmed by Joe. The seaman asks in German, "Aren't you going to kill me?" Kovac muses, "'Aren't you going to kill me?' What are you going to do with people like that?"  Stanley says "I don't know, I was thinking of Mrs. Higley and her baby, and Gus."  "Well," Connie says, "maybe they can answer that."

That ends the film, with the apparent conclusion that they were then rescued and returned to American society.

Cast

 Tallulah Bankhead as Constance "Connie" Porter
 William Bendix as Gus Smith
 Walter Slezak as Kapitan Willi
 Mary Anderson as Alice MacKenzie
 John Hodiak as John Kovac
 Henry Hull as Charles J. "Ritt" Rittenhouse Jr.
 Heather Angel as Mrs. Higley
 Hume Cronyn as Stanley "Sparks" Garrett
 Canada Lee as Joe Spencer

Cast notes
 William Yetter Jr. appeared on screen in a speaking role as the German sailor but was not listed in the film's credits.
 Except for a cameo appearance in Stage Door Canteen (1943), Bankhead had not appeared in a film since Faithless in 1932. She was paid $75,000 ($ million today) for her work in Lifeboat.

Production

At the time that Lifeboat went into production, Alfred Hitchcock was under contract to David O. Selznick. 20th Century Fox obtained the director's services in exchange for that of several actors and technicians, as well as the rights to three stories that Fox owned. Hitchcock was to direct two films for the studio, but the second was never made, apparently because Fox was unhappy with the length of time taken to finish production on Lifeboat.

It was Hitchcock who came up with the idea for the film. He approached A.J. Cronin, James Hilton and Ernest Hemingway to help write the script before giving the project to John Steinbeck, who had previously written the screenplay for the 1941 documentary The Forgotten Village but had not written a fictional story for the screen. It was Steinbeck's intention to write and publish a novel and sell the rights to the studio, but the story was never published because his literary agents considered it "inferior". Steinbeck received $50,000 ($ today) for the rights to his story. Steinbeck was unhappy with the film because it presented what he considered to be "slurs against organized labor" and a "stock comedy Negro" when his story had a "Negro of dignity, purpose and personality". He requested, unsuccessfully, that his name be removed from the credits. A short story version of Hitchcock's idea appeared in Collier's magazine on November 13, 1943. It was written by Harry Sylvester and Hitchcock, with Steinbeck credited with the "original screen story".  Jo Swerling wrote the bulk of the screenplay.  Other writers who worked on various drafts of the script include Hitchcock's wife Alma Reville, MacKinlay Kantor, Patricia Collinge, Albert Mannheimer and Marian Spitzer. Hitchcock also brought in Ben Hecht to rewrite the ending.

Lifeboat was originally planned to be filmed in Technicolor with an all-male cast, many of whom were going to be unknowns. Canada Lee, who was primarily a stage actor with only one film credit at the time, was the first actor cast in the film.

Hitchcock planned the camera angles for the film using a miniature lifeboat and figurines. Four lifeboats were used during shooting. Rehearsals took place in one, separate boats were used for close-ups and long shots and another was in the studio's large-scale tank, where water shots were made. Except for background footage shot by the second unit around Miami, in the Florida Keys and on San Miguel Island in California, the film was shot in the 20th Century Fox studio on Pico Boulevard in what is now Century City.

Lifeboat was in production from August 3 through November 17, 1943. Illnesses were a constant part of the production from the beginning. Before shooting began, William Bendix replaced actor Murray Alper when Alper became ill and after two weeks of shooting, director of photography Arthur Miller was replaced by Glen MacWilliams because of illness. Tallulah Bankhead came down with pneumonia twice during shooting, and Mary Anderson became seriously ill during production, causing several days of production time to be lost. Hume Cronyn suffered two cracked ribs and nearly drowned when he was caught under a water-activator making waves for a storm scene. He was saved by a lifeguard.

The film is unique among Hitchcock's American films for having no musical score during the narrative (apart from the singing of the U-boat captain and of Gus, accompanied by flute); the Fox studio orchestra was used only for the opening and closing credits. Hitchcock dismissed the idea of having music in a film about people stranded at sea by asking, "Where would the orchestra come from?" Hugo Friedhofer is said to have asked in reply, "Where would the cameras come from?"

Cameo

Director Alfred Hitchcock made cameo appearances in most of his films. He once commented to François Truffaut – in Hitchcock/Truffaut (Simon and Schuster, 1967) – that this particular cameo was difficult to achieve, due to the lack of passers-by in the film. Although he originally considered posing as a body floating past the lifeboat – an approach he later considered for his cameo in Frenzy – Hitchcock was inspired by his own success with weight loss and decided to pose for "before" and "after" photos in an advertisement for a fictional weight-loss drug, "Reduco", shown in a newspaper that was in the boat. Hitchcock said that he was besieged by letters from people asking about Reduco.  Hitchcock used the product again in Rope, where his profile and “Reduco” appear on a red neon sign.  The Lifeboat cameo appears 25 minutes into the film.

Production credits
The production credits on the film were as follows:
 Director – Alfred Hitchcock
 Producer – Kenneth Macgowan
 Writing – John Steinbeck (story), Jo Swerling (screenplay)
 Cinematography – Glen MacWilliams (director of photography)
 Art direction – James Basevi and Maurice Ransford (art direction); Thomas Little and Frank E. Hughes (set decoration)
 Film editor – Dorothy Spencer
 Costumes – René Hubert
 Makeup artist – Guy Pearce
 Special photographic effects – Fred Sersen
 Technical adviser (maritime) – Thomas Fitzsimmons
 Sound – Bernard Freericks and Roger Heman
 Music – Hugo W. Friedhofer (music), Emil Newman (musical director)

Response
While modern critics see the film positively, Lifeboat portrayal of a German character in what was perceived as a positive fashion caused considerable controversy at the time of its release, during the height of World War Two. Influential reviewers and columnists, including Dorothy Thompson and Bosley Crowther of The New York Times, saw the film as denigrating the American and British characters while glorifying the German. Crowther wrote that "the Nazis, with some cutting here and there, could turn Lifeboat into a whiplash against the 'decadent democracies.' And it is questionable whether such a picture, with such a theme, is judicious at this time." In Truffaut's 1967 book-length interview Hitchcock/Truffaut, Hitchcock paraphrased Thompson's criticism as "Dorothy Thompson gave the film ten days to get out of town."

Such commentary caused Steinbeck, who had previously been criticized because of his handling of German characters in The Moon Is Down, to publicly dissociate himself from the film, to denounce Hitchcock and Swerling's treatment of his material, and to request that his name not be used by Fox in connection with the presentation of the film. Crowther responded by detailing the differences between Steinbeck's novella and the film as released, accusing the film's creators of "pre-empting" Steinbeck's "creative authority".

Hitchcock responded to the criticism by explaining that the film's moral was that the Allies needed to stop bickering and work together to win the war, and he defended the portrayal of the German character, saying, "I always respect my villain, build[ing] him into a redoubtable character that will make my hero or thesis more admirable in defeating him or it." Bankhead backed him up in an interview in which she said that the director "wanted to teach an important lesson. He wanted to say that you can't trust the enemy... in Lifeboat you see clearly that you can't trust a Nazi, no matter how nice he seems to be."

Tallulah Bankhead called the criticism leveled at the film that it was too pro-Axis "moronic".

Criticism was also leveled at the script for its portrayal of the African-American character Joe as "too stereotypical". Actor Canada Lee testified that he had attempted to round out the character by revising dialogue, primarily eliminating repeated "yessir"s and "nossir"s that sounded subservient, and cutting some actions. The overseas section of the Office of War Information's Bureau of Motion Pictures reviewed the picture and for these and other racial characterizations recommended that Lifeboat not be distributed overseas. An NAACP critique of the film condemned Lee's role unequivocally although praising his performance. However the Baltimore Afro-Americans review, while commenting on shortcomings regarding the character, praised both the performance and its role depiction. Historian Rebecca Sklaroff, while writing that Joe's role was more "tokenistic" than black roles in the wartime films Sahara and Bataan, noted that Joe was also depicted as compassionate, dependable and heroic, the only cast member stepping forward to disarm the second German sailor rescued.

Critics praised the film's acting, directing, and cinematography and noted with appreciation the lack of background music once the film proper begins. Still, studio executives, under pressure because of the controversies, decided to give the film a limited release instead of the wide release most of Hitchcock's films received. Advertising for the film was also reduced, which resulted in the film's poor box office showing when it was released in 1944.

Awards and honors

Adaptations
NBC broadcast a one-hour radio adaptation of the film on Screen Directors Playhouse on November 16, 1950. Hitchcock directed, and Bankhead reprised her role from the film. The cast also featured Jeff Chandler and Sheldon Leonard.

In 1993, Lifeboat was remade as a science fiction TV movie under the title Lifepod. Moving the action from a lifeboat to a spaceship's escape capsule in the year 2169, the remake starred Ron Silver, who also directed, Robert Loggia, and CCH Pounder. The film was aired on the Fox channel in the United States. The film credited Hitchcock and Harry Sylvester for the story.

See also
 List of American films of 1944

ReferencesNotesFurther reading'''
 Federle, Steven J. "Lifeboat'' as Allegory: Steinbeck and the Demon of War." Steinbeck Quarterly 12.01-02 (Winter/Spring 1979): 14-20

External links

 
 
 
 
 
 Lifeboat on Screen Directors Playhouse: November 16, 1950
 Making of Lifeboat, YouTube

1940s adventure drama films
1944 films
20th Century Fox films
American adventure drama films
American black-and-white films
Films about survivors of seafaring accidents or incidents
Films based on short fiction
Films directed by Alfred Hitchcock
Films scored by Hugo Friedhofer
Films set in the Atlantic Ocean
Films set on boats
Films with screenplays by Jo Swerling
Seafaring films
Works by John Steinbeck
World War II films made in wartime
American survival films
1944 drama films
1940s English-language films